Bhavra also known as Bhabhra or Chandra Shekhar Azad Nagar is a town and a nagar panchayat in Alirajpur district in the state of Madhya Pradesh, India. It is the birthplace of the noted revolutionary Chandra Shekhar Azad.

Demographics

As of the 2011 Census of India, Bhabhra had a population of 10,968. Males constitute 51% of the population and females 49%. Bhabhra has an average literacy rate of 54%, lower than the national average of 59.5%; with male literacy of 62% and female literacy of 45%. 19% of the population is under 6 years of age.

Notable people 

 Kanhaiya Lal Chauhan.
 Chandra Shekhar Azad.

References

Cities and towns in Alirajpur district